São Francisco is a painting by Portuguese Renaissance artist Nuno Gonçalves, created c. 1470-1480. It represents Saint Francis, in his monk dress, holding a crucifix. It is held at the National Museum of Ancient Art, in Lisbon.

References

IMC-IP São Francisco de Nuno Gonçalves

Paintings by Nuno Gonçalves
Paintings in the collection of the National Museum of Ancient Art
Paintings of Francis of Assisi
Paintings of crucifixes